C. palustris  may refer to:
 Calamus palustris, a rattan palm species in the genus Calamus
 Caltha palustris, the kingcup or marsh marigold, a plant species native to temperate regions of the Northern Hemisphere
 Cistothorus palustris, the marsh wren, a small songbird species found in North America
 Claytonia palustris, a wildflower species in the purslane family known by the common names Jonesville springbeauty and marsh claytonia
 Coespeletia palustris, a wildflower native to the Andes
 Crocodylus palustris, the mugger crocodile, Indian, Indus, Persian or marsh crocodile, a reptile species found throughout the Indian subcontinent and the surrounding countries

See also
 Palustris (disambiguation)